Chris Beckford-Tseu (born June 22, 1984) is a Canadian former professional ice hockey goaltender who played in one National Hockey League (NHL) game with the St. Louis Blues during the 2007–08 season. He was drafted in the fifth round, 159th overall, by the Blues in the 2003 NHL Entry Draft.

Playing career
As a youth, Beckford-Tseu played in the 1998 Quebec International Pee-Wee Hockey Tournament with a minor ice hockey team from Vaughan, Ontario.

Beckford-Tseu began his career playing in the Ontario Hockey League. He was drafted 91st overall in the 2000 OHL Priority Draft. He played for the Guelph Storm, the Oshawa Generals and the Kingston Frontenacs. His best OHL year was with the Generals in 2002-03, where he had 25 wins and a 3.16 GAA.

In 2003, he was chosen 159th overall by the St. Louis Blues in the NHL Entry Draft.

In 2004, Beckford-Tseu started his professional career by appearing with the Peoria Rivermen, the Blues AHL affiliate. During the 2004-05 season, he accumulated a 2.71 GAA and a .908 SV% backing up Alfie Michaud.

NHL
Beckford-Tseu played in his first NHL game on February 21, 2008 against the Los Angeles Kings. In that game, he saved 8 shots out of 9.

The Panthers signed him as a free agent on July 3, 2008.

Beckford-Tseu played for the Worcester IceCats, Alaska Aces, Peoria Rivermen, and Rochester Americans.

Post career
Beckford-Tseu is currently the Goaltender Coach for Toronto Metropolitan University) men's hockey team, the TMU Bold. As well, he also started a program called "Professional Goaltending Development" where he, and former AHL player Rob Gherson, train young goalies.

Playing style
Beckford-Tseu is a big goalie who generally covers a lot of net. Despite that size, he tends not to challenge the shooters. He also has good reflexes.

See also
List of players who played only one game in the NHL

References

External links

Hockey's Future profile

1984 births
Living people
Alaska Aces (ECHL) players
Black Canadian ice hockey players
Canadian ice hockey goaltenders
Canadian people of Jamaican descent
Canadian sportspeople of Chinese descent
Greenville Road Warriors players
Guelph Storm players
Hakka sportspeople
Kingston Frontenacs players
Oshawa Generals players
Peoria Rivermen (AHL) players
Peoria Rivermen (ECHL) players
St. Louis Blues draft picks
St. Louis Blues players
Sportspeople from Scarborough, Toronto
Ice hockey people from Toronto
Worcester IceCats players